Mount Mills may refer to:

 Mount Mills (Alaska) on the Kenai Peninsula
 Mount Mills (California) in the Sierra Nevada range
 Mount Mills (Idaho)
 Mounts Mills, New Jersey, an unincorporated community
 Mount Mills (Antarctica) in the Dominion Range of Antarctica